Nara (Manchu: , Wade-Giles: nara hala, Chinese: ,  or ) is a clan name shared by a number of royal Manchu clans. The four tribes of the Hūlun confederation – Hada, Ula, Hoifa and Yehe – were all ruled by clans bearing this name.

The head of each clan held the princely title of "beile" (Manchu: "chief, lord, or Prince of the Third Rank").

During the Jin Dynasty, Nara was listed as one of the noble "white clans".

Nara is the Mongolic word for 'sun'. In Mongolia, the sun is associated to Genghis Khan as the nara tamga is the main tamga attributed to him.

History
The Naras lived in the Haixi area, which encompasses parts of modern-day Jilin, Heilongjiang, Liaoning and Inner Mongolia. The Hada Naras and Ula Naras are native to Manchuria and shared an ancestor. The Yehe Naras were founded by a Tümed Mongol prince Singgen Darhan who conquered the local Nara tribe and assumed their name, establishing his rule over the banks of the Yehe river. The Hoifa Naras, on the other hand, came from the local Ikderi clan.

During Nurhaci's efforts to unite the Jurchen people, the Naras resisted because they had always been rather well-treated by the Ming government. Instead they tried to appease Nurhaci by offering him a daughter from each of the tribal rulers, the most famous of which were Lady Abahai of the Ula tribe and Monggo Jerjer of the Yehe tribe. Nonetheless, Nurhaci eventually began his assault against the Naras, and the Hada, Ula and Hoifa tribes soon fell. The Yehe Naras were able to resist the longest as they were the largest and strongest of the tribes, but even they soon had to enlist the help of the Ming empire.

Using Ming's sympathy towards the Yehe Naras as an excuse, Nurhaci began to wage war against the Ming forces as well. Both the Ming soldiers and the Yehe Naras were defeated in subsequent battles, including the Battle of Sarhu, and the Yehe Nara prince Jintaiji was either forced to kill himself or hanged, but not before he allegedly cursed Nurhaci that as long as one of Jintaiji's descendants lived, even a female one, he or she would remember the clan's vendetta and bring down the Aisin Gioros. The last prince of the Ula tribe Bujantai, who was fighting alongside the Yehe Naras, was captured as well and later killed by Nurhaci's first son, Cuyen.

The Hada and Hoifa clans fell from prominence after Nurhaci's Manchurian conquest, whereas Ula and Yehe survived the defeat and integrated into Qing's Banner aristocracy. They continued to be powerful clans in the Qing court, often named among the eight great Manchu houses. Modern day Nara descendants mostly hail from these two clans.

Present-day descendants of the Nara clan generally adopted "Nà" (那) and "Zhào" (趙) as Chinese surnames, to conform to the monosyllabic Han family names. Others, less commonly, took "Nà" (納 or 訥), "Bái" (白), "Nán" (南), "Liú" (劉), "Sū" (蘇). Those descended from Hada Nara took "Wáng" (王). Descendants of Yehe Nara primarily chose "Yè" (葉), "Hè" (赫), or "Hé" (何), others took after their Borjigin forebears and used "Bāo" (鮑 or 包) or "Bó" (博). The Hoifa Nara line is extinct.

Notable figures of the Nara
 Males
 Wenbin (1825–1880), a prominent government official

Prince Consort

 Females
Imperial Consort
 Empress 
 Step-Empress (1718–1766), the Qianlong Emperor's second empress, the mother of Yongji (1752–1776), fifth daughter (1753–1755) and Yongjing (1756–1757)

 Noble Lady
 Noble Lady, the Kangxi Emperor's noble lady, the mother of Wanfu (1675–1679) and Yinzan (1679–1680)

Princess Consort
 Primary Consort
 Šurhaci's sixth primary consort
 Manggūltai's first wife
 Dodo's third primary consort
 Šose's first primary consort, the mother of Princess Heshun (1648–1692), Boguoduo (1650–1723) and Bo'erguoluo (1651–1712)
 Changning's first primary consort

 Secondary Consort
 Hooge's secondary consort, the mother of third daughter (1638–1646)
 Yunyou's secondary consort, the mother of Princess (1696 – 1720 or 1721), Hongshu (1698–1738), Princess (1699–1733), Hongzhuo (1700–1743) and Hongxin (1702–1712)

 Concubine
 Hong Taiji's concubine, the mother of Lady (1635–1661), Gose (1637–1670) and 13th daughter (1638–1657)
 Dodo's concubine, the mother of Zhulan (1635–1665)
 Hooge's concubine, the mother of Qizheng'e (1634–1677)
 The Shunzhi Emperor's concubine, the mother of sixth daughter (1657–1661)
 Fuquan's concubine, the mother of Princess (1700–1733), Princess (1701–1732) and seventh daughter (1703–1704)
 Yinxiang's concubine, the mother of Amuhulang (1726–1727)

Wanyan Nara
Nacibulu was the first to adopt the clan name Nara. A Jurchen clan native to Manchuria, they descended from the imperial Wanyan clan of the Jin dynasty.

The Nara gradually grew to become the dominant clan in the Haixi region, culminating in the establishment of the Hūlun confederation in the 16th century, with Nara princes at its core. At the same time, this Nara clan split into two branches: the senior Hada line founded by Kesina, leader of the Hūlun confederation, and the junior Ula line founded by Kesina's younger brother Gudai Juyan.

Notable figures of the Wanyan Nara
 Nacibulu (fl. 14th century)
 Shangyandorheqi, Nacibulu's son
 Jiamaka, Shangyandorheqi's son

Hada Nara
The Hada Nara (哈達那拉氏) ruled the Hada state, based around the Hada river in southwestern Manchuria. Descended from the Wanyan, they are native to Manchuria and kin to the Ula Nara.

Under the prince (beile) Wangtai, the Hada Nara gained ascendency over the Haixi Jurchens. He assumed the title Wan Khan (萬汗), and held hegemony in the Hūlun confederation.

In 1574, Wang Tai captured the rebellious Jianzhou Jurchen leader Wanggao, and was rewarded by the Ming court with the titles Right Pillar of State (右柱國, the highest honorary civil title) and Dragon-Tiger General (龍虎將軍, the highest honorary military title), further legitimising the Hada supremacy in Haixi.

Upon Wangtai's death (1582), a succession struggle ensued, sapping Hada of its strength and allowing the Yehe Nara and later Nurhaci to eclipse its power. In 1599, Narimbulu of Yehe invaded Hada. Weakened, Menggebulu (beile of Hada) requests aid from Nurhaci. Nurhaci sent two thousand troops led by Fiongdon (費英東) and Gagai (噶蓋). Fearing the rise of the Jianzhou Jurchens, Narimbulu in turn offered to ally with Menggebulu to defeat Nurhaci. Menggebulu accepted the offer, but the plot was leaked and Nurhaci attacked Hada instead.

Nurhaci's general Yangguli (揚古利) captured the Hada Castle and the ruling Hada Nara clan. Nurhaci spared Menggebulu and offered him an alliance, but Menggebulu again plotted to assassinate Nurhaci. This plot was also discovered, leading to his execution.

In 1601, Nurhaci married his daughter to Urgūdai, who succeeded Menggebulu. The Ming court accused Nurhaci of attempting to annex Hada. In response, Nurhaci released Urgūdai from Jianzhou and allowed him to return to rule Hada. Learning this, Narimbulu of Yehe again started raiding Hada. Severely weakened and defenseless, Urgūdai eventually capitulated and submitted to Nurhaci's rule, becoming the last beile of Hada.

Notable figures of the Hada Nara
 Males
 Kesina, Suitun's son; leader of the Hūlun confederation, founder of the Hada Nara line
 Wangzhong (Wangju Wailan) (d. 1552), Kesina's second son; first beile of Hada state
 Wangtai (Wan) (d. 1582), Wangzhong's nephew; Khan of Hūlun confederation, legitimised client overlord of Haixi under Ming
 Hurhan (d. 1582), Wangtai's first son
 Daišan (d. 1591), Hurhan's son
 Menggebulu (1565–1600), Wangtai's son
 Ulhūda, Menggebulu's first son; last independent beile of Hada

Prince Consort

 Females
Princess Consort
 Primary Consort
 Šurhaci's second primary consort, the mother of Eshitai (1584–1656)
 Manggūltai's second wife, the mother of Maidali (1603–1634), Guanggu (1604–1606), Sahaliang (1606–1642), Ebilun (b. 1609), Feiyanggutai (b. 1610) and Aketama (1620–1622)
 Hooge's first primary consort (d. 1636)
 Yunyou's primary consort, the mother of third daughter (1699–1702) and Princess (1701–1729)

 Secondary Consort
 Amin Jerjer, Nurhaci's secondary consort
 Daišan's secondary consort, the mother of Majan (1612–1638) and seventh daughter (1629–1649)

Ula Nara
The Ula Nara (烏拉那拉氏) ruled the Ula state, based around Hulan river in northeastern Manchuria. They shared Wanyan descent with the Hada Nara.

Of the four tribes, Ula was the economic and cultural powerhouse of Manchuria. The Ula tribe were mostly traders, buying horses, livestock, and fur from the steppe Mongols and selling them at the Jianzhou plateau on the Liao river basin, the economic center and farmland of the Manchu region. They in turn buy grains such as millet and corn at Jianzhou and sell them to the Mongols. The Ula Naras, for a large part, controlled trade between Manchuria and Mongolia by controlling the mountain pass at modern day Baicheng, Jilin, where the only passage between the two areas was located.

The Nara chief Buyan built the Ula Castle by the Hulan river and founded the Ula state. (Ula means "riverside" in Manchu.)

Ula and Jianzhou had numerous conflicts, culminating in the Battle of Mount Gele. Defeated at Mount Gele, Mantai fled back to Ula but was killed by his subordinates 3 years later in 1596.

On the other hand, Mantai's younger brother, the second beile Bujantai was captured at Mount Gele. Bujantai submitted to Nurhaci and married both Nurhaci's and Surgaci's daughters. Upon Mantai's death, Nurhaci aided Bujantai in defeating other Ula Nara pretenders to regain the Ula throne. The following year, he married his younger sister to Surgaci to formalise the alliance. Two years later, he again married Mantai's daughter Lady Abahai to Nurhaci, who later became his primary consort.

The alliance between Ula and Jianzhou did not last, however. Warka, a Donghai Jurchen tribe, after repeated harassment by Bujantai, sought to submit to Nurhaci. Nurhaci sent troops to annex Warka, which Ula tried to intercept. The alliance broken, the two states resumed their conflicts. Eventually, Nurhaci captured Ula Castle and annexed the Ula state. Bujantai alone fled to Yehe, and spent the rest of his life under the protection of the Yehe Nara.

The descendants of the last Ula princes were mostly incorporated into the Plain White Banner. They supplied numerous high officials and imperial consorts to the Qing court and are among the most prominent Manchu noble houses.

Butha Ula Nara
After Nurhaci captured the Ula, he kept the royal clansmen in hostage. In order to induce Bujantai to surrender, Nurhaci showered Hongko, Bujantai's youngest son, with favours. He married one of his daughters to Hongko, granted a small fief near the Ula capital, named him the beile of Butha Ula (布特哈烏拉貝勒), and left him "independent" from the Banner system.

As he reached maturity, Hongko realised that his independence is only nominal. He plotted to rebel against Jin, but the plot was exposed and Hongko forced to commit suicide. His two sons survived his downfall. The eldest Ulon took the Chinese surname Zhao and hid out in exile, eventually reintegrating into their Ula kins into the Plain White Banner years later. The younger Ula (not to be confused with the clan name) was saved by his Aisin Gioro mother and brought back into the Jin fold.

Notable figures of the Ula Nara
 Males
 Gudai Juyan, founder of the Ula Nara line
 Tailan, Gudai Juyan's son
 Buyan, Tailan's son; first beile and founder of the Ula state
 Bugan, Buyan's first son
 Mantai (d. 1596), Bugan's second son
 Bujantai (1575–1618), Bugan's third son; last independent beile of Ula
 Bokdo (d. 1607), Buyan's youngest son
 Changzhu, Buyan's grandson

Prince Consort

 Females
Imperial Consort
 Empress
 Abahai, Empress Xiaoliewu (1590–1626), Nurhaci's fourth primary consort, the mother of Ajige (1605–1651), Dorgon (1612–1650) and Dodo (1614–1649)
 Duoqimuli, Empress Xiaojingxian (1681–1731), the Yongzheng Emperor's empress, the mother of Honghui (1697–1704)

 Consort
 Huase, Consort Hui (d. 1732), the Kangxi Emperor's consort, the mother of Chengqing (1670–1671) and Yunzhi (1671–1735)

 Imperial Concubine
 Zhanjimai, Imperial Concubine Tong (1664–1744), the Kangxi Emperor's noble lady, the mother of Princess Chunque (1685–1710)

Princess Consort
 Primary Consort
 Hunai, Šurhaci's fifth primary consort, the mother of Jirgalang (1599–1655)
 Hong Taiji's second primary consort, the mother of Hooge (1609–1648), Loge (1611–1621) and Princess (1621–1654)

Hoifa Nara
The Hoifa Nara (輝發那拉氏) ruled the Hoifa state, based around the Hoifa river in southeastern Manchuria. The Hoifa Nara descended from the Ikderi clan (益克得里氏) of the Nimaca tribe (尼瑪察部) from the Amur river banks to the north. When they migrated southward, they came under the protection of the royal Nara clan, eventually adopting the Nara clan name. As Nara, they grew to become a powerful Haixi clan. For two generations prior to assuming the Hoifa beile princeship, they had been appointed tributary military commanders (都督) loyal to the Ming court.

Wangginu was the first of the clan to assume the beile title. He built his castle on the Hurki Mountain, which provided him a secure power base. He established Hoifa as a major force in the Haixi region, and even withstood assaults by the Chahar Mongols.

Upon Wangginu's death, Baindari seized the throne, killing seven of his uncles in the process. Hoifa was a major member of the coalition defeated by Nurhaci at the Battle of Mount Gele (古勒山之戰). Severely weakened and stuck between the ascendant Jianzhou and Yehe states, Baindari tried to play both sides against each other, and relying on the defensible Hoifa Castle for security. This policy further isolated Hoifa, and Hoifa Castle eventually fell to Nurhaci in 1607. Baindari and his sons were killed in the battle, ending the princely Hoifa Nara main line.

Notable figures of the Hoifa Nara
 Males
 Anggūli Singgūli, of the Ikederi clan, adopted the Nara clan name
 Beicen
 Nalingga
 Laha
 Gahacan, tributary commander under Ming
 Cinegen Darhan, tributary commander under Ming
 Wangginu, Cinagen Darhan's son; first beile and founder of Hoifa state
 Baindari (d. 1607), Wangginu's grandson

 Females
Imperial Consort
 Consort
 Consort He (d. 1836), the Daoguang Emperor's consort, the mother of Yiwei (1808–1831)

 Imperial Concubine
 Imperial Concubine Shun (1809–1868), the Daoguang Emperor's first class female attendant

 Noble Lady
 Noble Lady Na (1825–1865), the Daoguang Emperor's second class female attendant

Princess Consort
 Primary Consort
 Šurhaci's eighth primary consort

Yehe Nara
The Yehe Nara (葉赫那拉氏) ruled the Yehe state, based around the Yehe river. This area was originally called Zhang (張), occupied by the Hulun (扈倫) tribe. The progenitor of the clan, Singgen Darhan, was a Genghisid prince of the Tümed Mongols. He was appointed by Ming as commander of the Talumu division (塔魯木衛). They later migrated southward, and his grandson Cirugani assimilated into the local Nara aristocracy, assuming their name. Cirugani's son Jukungge finally took over the Yehe area and established the Yehe Nara state.

Initially, Yehe was relatively weak and was frequently raided by Hada. Conflict between Yehe and Hada continued until the reign of Cinggiyanu and Yangginu, who were sons of the beile Taicu. They expanded Yehe's territory through conquest of smaller neighbouring states, consolidated Yehe's powerbase with the construction of two castles, and made peace with Hada; Cinggiyanu married a daughter of Wangtai and Wangtai married Cinggiyanu's younger sister. With the support of Hada, Cinggiyanu and Yangginu successfully defeated the other sons of Taicu and gained the throne of Yehe themselves.

From the rule of Cinggiyanu and Yangginu, the Yehe Nara had a unique system of co-princeship. Cinggiyanu and Yangginu built two castles on strategic locations only several li apart. These were the West Yehe Castle and the East Yehe Castle, held by Cinggiyanu's and Yangginu's families respectively. The two co-princes were both equal beiles, ruled Yehe jointly, and acted in unity until the fall of Yehe.

Upon Wangtai's death, Yehe, along with Hoifa and Ula, broke away from Hada's hegemony. They allied to attack Hada, only to be defeated by the reinforcement from Ming. Cinggiyanu and Yangginu both died in this battle, and were succeeded by Bujai and Narimbulu respectively.

Narimbulu allied with their Tümed and Khorchin Mongol kins to attack Hada again. This time Narimbulu managed to defeat the Ming reinforcement and destroyed Hada as a major power, becoming the most powerful of the Haixi tribes and the new leader of the Hulun confederation.

Seeing Nurhaci's rise, Yehe initially sought to make peace by marrying Narimbulu's sister Monggo Jerjer to Nurhaci (later Empress Xiaocigao). She would later give birth to Hong Taiji, who would succeed Nurhaci and found the Qing dynasty. This peace was short-lived, however, and Yehe soon entered a long struggle against Nurhaci's domination. Princes Bujai and Narimbulu lead the nine-tribe coalition against Nurhaci's Jianzhou forces at the Battle of Mount Gele, which ended in decisive defeat. The Yehe state continued to resist the newly formed Jin dynasty until the fall of the East Yehe Castle, the last bastion to stand against Jin's Manchurian conquest.

The Yehe Nara is the most legendary of the Nara clans today, in part due to its status as the last Jurchen clan to challenge Nurhaci's hegemony, in part to the imperial favourites they issued, and also because of Empress Dowager Cixi, who descended from a cadet branch of the East Yehe Nara belonging to the Bordered Blue Banner. The descendants of the princes of East Yehe were mostly incorporated into the Plain Yellow Banner; a cadet branch descending from Asi Darhan (阿什達爾漢, brother of Gin Taisi) were incorporated into the Plain White Banner, while those of West Yehe were mostly incorporated into the Plain Red Banner. They supplied numerous high officials and imperial consorts to the Qing court and are a fixture among the eight great Manchu houses. In common usage, the Nara clan most often refers to the Yehe Nara.

A popular legend says that Gin Taisi, the last prince of East Yehe, upon defeat by Nurhaci, cursed that the Yehe Nara will be the downfall of the Aisin Gioro clan, even if there's only Yehe Nara daughters left. This curse was supposedly fulfilled with Empress Dowager Longyu who formally abdicated on the behalf of Puyi leading to the end of the Manchu dynasty.

Notable figures of the Yehe Nara
 Males
 Singgen Darhan
 Sirke Minggatu
 Cirugani, adopted the Nara clan name
 Cukungge, first beile and founder of the Yehe state
 Taicu, Jukungge's son
 Cinggiyanu (d. 1584), Taicu's first son; first beile of West Yehe
 Bujai (d. 1593), Cinggiyanu's son
 Buyanggū (d. 1619), Bujai's younger brother
 Yangginu (d. 1584), Taicu's second son; first beile of East Yehe
 Narimbulu (d. 1609), Yangginu's son; leader of the Hulun confederation
 Gintaisi (d. 1619), Narimbulu's younger brother
 Mingju (1635–1708), Gintaisi's grandson; a top-ranking government official during the reign of the Kangxi Emperor
 Singde (1655–1685), Mingju's first son by Ajige's fifth daughter; a famous poet
 Yongfu, Mingju's grandson
 Suna (d. 1648)
 Suksaha (d. 1667), Suna's son by Nurhaci's sixth daughter; served as one of the Four Regents of the Kangxi Emperor
 Ruilin (1809–1874), the Viceroy of Liangguang from 1865 to 1874

Prince Consort

 Females
 Chia-ying Yeh (born 1924), poet and sinologist, fellow of the Royal Society of Canada
 Na Ying (born 1967), female pop singer
 Chen Lihua (born 1941), entrepreneur and philanthropist

Imperial Consort
 Empress
 Monggo Jerjer, Empress Xiaocigao (1575–1603), Nurhaci's third primary consort, the mother of Hong Taiji (1592–1643)
 Xingzhen, Empress Xiaoqinxian (1835–1908), the Xianfeng Emperor's noble consort, the mother of the Tongzhi Emperor (1856–1875)
 Empress Xiaodingjing (1868–1913), the Guangxu Emperor's empress

 Consort
 Consort Shu (1728–1777), the Qianlong Emperor's consort, the mother of Yongyue, the emperor's tenth son (1751–1753)
 Consort Lu (1841–1895), the Xianfeng Emperor's noble lady

 Imperial Concubine
 Imperial Concubine Shu (1840–1874), the Xianfeng Emperor's noble lady
 Imperial Concubine Yu (1843–1863), the Xianfeng Emperor's noble lady

Princess Consort
 Primary Consort
 Cuyen's second wife, the mother of first daughter (1601–1670), second daughter (1603–1623), third daughter (1606–1673) and Nikan (1610–1652)
 Daišan's second primary consort, the mother of Princess (1602–1649), Sahaliyan (1604–1636), Wakda (1606–1652) and Balama (1608–1631)
 Subenzhu, Daišan's third primary consort, the mother of Mandahai (1622–1652), Princess (1624–1685), Princess (1626–1646) and Hūse (1628–1646)
 Wanzhen (1841–1896), Yixuan's primary consort, the mother of first daughter (1861–1866), Zaihan (1865–1866), the Guangxu Emperor (1871–1908), third son (1875) and Zaiguang (1880–1884)

 Secondary Consort
 Nanakun, Nurhaci's secondary consort, the mother of Princess (1612–1646)
 Wuyunzhu, Hong Taiji's secondary consort, the mother of Šose (1629–1655)

See also
 List of Manchu clans
 List of Chieftains of the Jurchens

Manchu clans
Qing dynasty people